The Arab Parliament is the legislative body of the Arab League. At the 19th Arab League Summit in Amman, the Arab states agreed to create an Arab Parliament, and came up with a resolution to give Amr Moussa the Secretary General of the Arab League the power to start and create the Parliament. In 2004, in the ordinary Arab League Summit in Algiers was the official date where all Arab League Members agreed to send their representative to the temporary Parliament sessions that took place in the headquarters of the Arab League in Cairo, Egypt, with each member state sending four members, until the Parliament is reassigned permanently to its under-construction office in Damascus.

The headquarters was in Damascus until on May 22, 2012, the sessions were suspended and transferred to Cairo. The Arab League is now preparing to move the headquarters of the parliament to Baghdad.

Adel Al Asoomi (of Bahrain) is the current Speaker of the Parliament.

List of Members of the Parliament

 Algeria : Abd-Allah Bousnan
 Algeria : Abd-El-Hak Boumashra
 Algeria : Ammar Sa'adany
 Algeria : Amr Bouiflan
 Bahrain : Abd-El-Aziz Abd-Allah Al-Moussiy
 Comoros : Elwei Sayed Muhammed
 Comoros : Nour-Eddine Midlaj
 Djibouti : Abd-El-Rahman Hassan Riala
 Djibouti : Fahmy Ahmed Muhammed Al-Hajj
 Djibouti : Moemen Bahdoun Fareh
 Djibouti : Muhammed Edwita Yousif
 Egypt : Mostafa El-Feqqy
 Egypt : Raga'a Ismail al Arabi
 Egypt : Sa'ad Gamal
 Egypt : Sana Abd El-Mene'em El-Banna
 Iraq : Abbas Al-Biat.        i
 Iraq : Moufid El-Jaza'ery
 Iraq : Nour-Eddine Sa'id El-Heyaly
 Iraq : Sertib Muhammad Hussein
 Jordan : Abd-El-Hady Attallah Ammegalli
 Jordan : Abd-El-Karim Faisal El-Daghmy
 Jordan : Muhammed Abd-Allah Abou-Hedib
 Jordan : Salwa Damin El-Masri
 Kuwait : Abd-El-Wahed Mahmoud El-Awadi
 Kuwait : Ali Salim Al-Daqbasi
 Kuwait : Awad Bard El-Enzzi
 Kuwait : Mohammed Jassem Al-Sager
 Kuwait : Walid Khaled Al-Gary
 Lebanon : Ali Khreiss
 Lebanon : Robert Iskandar Ghanem
 Libya : Hoda Fathy Salim Bin-Amer
 Libya : Abd Alsalam Naseya 
 Mauritania : Muhammed Weld El-Sheikh Al-Moustafa
 Mauritania : Muhammed Weld Harun Weld El-Sheikh Seddeya
 Mauritania : Muhammed Weld Muhammed El-Hafez
 Mauritania : Salma Bint Tekdi
 Morocco : Abd-El-Raham Lidek
 Morocco : Abd-El-Wahed Arrady
 Morocco : Seddik Ghoule
 Oman : Ali Bin-Said El Behya'i
 Oman : Fahd Bin-Majid Al-Mamari
 Oman : Sief Bin Hashim El-Maskary
 Oman : Soud Bin Ahmed El Berouani
 Palestine : Rawhi Fattouh
 Palestine : Salim Zanoun
 Qatar : Aisha Yousef al-Mannai
 Qatar : Mubarak Ghanem Bouthamer Ali
 Qatar : Nasser Khalil El-Jidah
 Saudi Arabia : Mansour Bin-Mahmoud Abd-El-Ghaffar
 Saudi Arabia : Muhammed Bin-Abd-Allah Bin-Muhammed El-Ghamdi
 Saudi Arabia : Muhammed Bin-Ibrahim Bin-Muhammed El-Helwa
 Somalia : Dr Zacheria Mohamud Haji Abdi
 Somalia : Muhammed Amr Tolha
 Somalia : Muhammed Mualim Abd-El-Rahman
 Somalia : Qamar Adam Ali
 Sudan : Muhammed El-Hussein Al-Amin Ahmed Nasser
 Sudan : Salih Ahmed El-Toum El-Omraby
 Sudan : Samia Hussein Sayed Ahmed
 Syria : Mahmoud El-Abrash
 Syria : Nasser Qaddour
 Tunisia : A'eda Morgan Haram El-Shemsy
 Tunisia : Muhammed Bin-Hady Ouaynee
 Tunisia : Muhammed Sobhi Boudreballah
 Tunisia : Omara Bin-Muhammed Al-Makhloufy
 United Arab Emirates : Abd-El-Rahman Ali Al-Shamsy
 United Arab Emirates : Muhammed Salim El-Mazrouy
 Yemen : Abd-Allah Ahmed Ghanem
 Yemen : Ali Abd-allah Abou-Hleika
 Yemen : Mansour Aziz Hamoud El-Zendany

Observers
 (2010)

References

External links
League of Arab States
Arab Inter-parliamentary Union

Arab League
Parliamentary assemblies
Supranational legislatures